Queen Louise Island or Kissarsiitilik is an uninhabited island in the Kujalleq municipality in southern Greenland.

The island was named Dronning Louise Ø after Queen Louise of Sweden (1851–1926), wife of King Frederick VIII of Denmark.

Geography
Queen Louise Island is a coastal island located off King Frederick VI Coast in southeastern Greenland between two narrow fjords on the southern side of the mouth of Lindenow Fjord.

Queen Louise Island is mountainous, Nuussuaq the tallest of its three main peaks reaching  in height. The island's coast is deeply indented and off its easternmost point lies the smaller island of Kanajoorartuut. Nanuuseq Island lies 7.7 km to the north, on the other side of the mouth of Lindenow Fjord.

See also
List of islands of Greenland

References

External links
 Ketilidian structure and the rapakivi suite between Lindenow Fjord and Kap Farvel, South-East Greenland
Uninhabited islands of Greenland
Kujalleq
ceb:Dronning Louise Ø
sv:Dronning Louise Ø